Tsévié is a city and canton in the Maritime Region of Togo. It is situated 32 km north of the capital Lomé and at the 2010 Census had a population of 54,474. The city is inhabited primarily by Ewe people. It is the capital of the prefecture of Zio and the Maritime Region.

The town is an important market centre for trading and is noted for its palm oil processing. Tsévié has road and railway links with Notsé, Atakpamé, and Blitta to the north and with Lomé to the south. The inhabitants of the city used to worship idols, but now many follow Christianity. Their traditional celebration is Ayizan, in which they demonstrate their old traditions, but now use this celebration as a symbol for unity and peace. Tsevie is a developing city that attracts many tourists.

Twin towns – sister cities
Tsévié is twinned with:
 Parthenay, France, since 1990
 Plainfaing, France, since 2015

Notable people 
 Adjoavi Trenou, activist and politician (1921–2008)
 Bella Bellow, singer (1945–1973)
 Kuami Agboh, football player 
 Cyril Guedjé, football player

References 

Populated places in Maritime Region
Cantons of Togo